See also Autoette (1948-70 automobile).

The Autoette was an automobile manufactured in Manistee, Michigan, by the Manistee Motor Car Company from 1910 to 1913.  The Autoette was one of the first cyclecars.  It had a single cylinder, 5-hp engine that was 0.4L in size, and a friction transmission.  The two-seater roadster cost $300, and was also known as the Manistee.

See also
Brass Era car

References
 

Cyclecars
Brass Era vehicles
Cars introduced in 1910
Motor vehicle manufacturers based in Michigan
Defunct motor vehicle manufacturers of the United States
Defunct companies based in Michigan